Prior to the advent of the NCAA Division I Men's Ice Hockey Tournament in 1948, the champion of college ice hockey in the United States was not officially decided, at least not according to the NCAA.

History
Inn the early years, naming a champion was a fairly easy task as there were few active teams and many played one another during the season. Some upper-echelon schools formed an intercollegiate hockey league around the turn of the century and began playing one another on a consistent basis. Due to this informal schedule the schools were able to declare a champion between the members and have that team serve as the de facto collegiate champion. Several of the smaller schools, like Williams College or Union College were not considered for the championship for a few reasons, chief among which was that their level of competition usually did not raise to the standards of Harvard or Yale.

After World War I ice hockey teams began sprouting up across New England and the rust belt making the naming of an individual champion more difficult. As a result the regions (East and West) would usually have their own intercollegiate champion.

Champions

Team titles

See also
List of United States collegiate men's ice hockey seasons
List of NCAA Division I men's ice hockey champions

References

 
United States collegiate men's ice hockey Champions